Fauna of San Marino may refer to:

 List of birds of San Marino
 List of mammals of San Marino

See also
 Outline of San Marino